The Sakuradamon incident, referred to in Korea today as the Patriotic Deed of Lee Bong-chang, was an assassination attempt against Emperor Hirohito of the Empire of Japan by a Korean independence activist, Lee Bong-chang, in Tokyo on 9 January 1932.

Assassination attempt
As Emperor Hirohito was departing the Imperial Palace via the Sakuradamon Gate on his way to reviewing a military parade, Lee Bong-chang, a member of the Korean Patriotic Legion under the Provisional Government of the Republic of Korea headed by Kim Gu in Shanghai, threw a hand grenade at the emperor's horse carriage.

Lee knew of the emperor's schedule from a newspaper article, and managed to approach close to the procession disguised as a Kempeitai military policeman. However, the hand grenade missed, and exploded near the carriage of Imperial Household Minister Baron Ichiki Kitokuro instead, killing two horses. The would-be assassin was quickly apprehended by the Imperial Guard.

Lee was convicted on September 30, 1932, and was executed in Ichigaya Prison (市谷刑務所) on October 10 of the same year.

Consequences
To take responsibility for the lapse in security, Prime Minister Tsuyoshi Inukai offered his resignation, which was not accepted by the emperor.

The attempted assassination had no impact on Japanese policies towards the Korean peninsula, and was quickly dismissed in Japan as an isolated terrorist incident. However, the Provisional Government of the Republic of Korea hailed the event as evidence of the ongoing opposition to Japanese rule in Korea. When these sentiments were echoed in the newspaper of the ruling Kuomintang party in the Republic of China, the Japanese government formally issued a diplomatic protest, and the issue led to an increase in anti-Chinese sentiment in Japan at a time when relations were already extremely strained.

Lee was posthumously honored by the government of the Republic of Korea with the Order of Merit for National Foundation in 1962, and a commemorative postage stamp in 1992. Lee  is also honored with statue in Hyochang Park in Seoul.

See also
 Korea under Japanese rule
 Korean independence movement
 Yoon Bong-gil

Notes

References

1932 in Japan
1932 crimes in Japan
Anti-Japanese sentiment in Korea
Empire of Japan
Failed assassination attempts in Japan
Tokyo Imperial Palace
Korean independence movement
Hirohito
January 1932 events
1930s in Tokyo
Terrorist incidents in the 1930s